Anna Watson may refer to:

 Anna Watson (comics), Marvel Comics character
 Anna Watson (politician), Australian politician
 Anna Watson (cheerleader), American fitness model and cheerleader